Erphaan Alves (born November 23, 1991) is a Trinidadian soca recording artist and songwriter. He initially gained full recognition in the soca world 2012 when he qualified as a finalist in both Groovy and International Power Soca Monarch Finals with the songs "In your Eyes" and "Terrible". His transition to soca megastar proved complete when he cued the HD band into his 2018 monster hit ‘Overdue’.

Erphaan was awarded Best New Male Soca Artist in the International Soca Awards 2012 and he was also an MTV IGGY Artiste of The Week that year. Erphaan acts as a songwriter alongside his soca career, writing songs such as "Precision Wine" sang by Kes the band, "Make You Rock", "Take You Home" and "Doh Friad" sang by Machel Montano.

Early life and career 

Erphaan Alves was born on November 23, 1991, in Chaguanas, Trinidad and Tobago, where he grew up with his parents and brother. He attended Rosary Boy's RC Primary School in Port of Spain, then went on to St. George's College, Barataria where he participated in several competitions, and was the lead male vocalist of the school's parang group. He later moved on to complete a Bachelor of Arts in Musical Arts from the University of the West Indies, St Augustine Campus in 2013. Erphaan began singing at the age of nine and gained recognition when he entered Rosary Boys RC School Calypso Competition Calypso World in 2001 and won with his upbeat rendition, "Carnival Time". He moved on to make his name in both the Junior Calypso and Junior Soca Monarch Competitions, winning consecutively in the latter, in 2008 and 2009 with his own compositions titled "Soca Moving" and "Musical Journey".

Soca originated in Trinidad and Tobago and was created by Trinidadian Garfield Blackman, who felt calypso was fading away. Soca derived from calypso fused with Indian music. Soca has grown into a massive industry taking over the Carnival Scene and Carnival Road March Arena. Soca artist records, releases and perform continuously during carnival season to ensure a chance of winning Carnival Road March song and the Soca Monach. Erphaan managed to consistently make waves being a finalist in the International Soca Monarch 2014 and 2015. His song, "On D Spot" was once featured on an MTV Real World Episode in 2012. The musician offered his hit single 'Overdue' and an energetic collaboration with the soca queen Destra Garcia called 'Waistline Pelting'  to 2018 carnival.

Community Engagement 
Erphaan's success can be owned by the strong support system he had from family, friends, and St George's College, the secondary school he attended. In an effort to give back to his secondary school community, he created Alves' St George College music fund through which he donates musical equipment. This music fund falls under the umbrella 'tEAm' a larger organization formed by Alves and friends to do more in his community. "Together Each Achieves More, it is actually an acronym, me showing that I care about them just as much as they cared about me at the start of my career. I have a platform now to shed light on everybody and in turn as we grow together they shed light on me," Alves explains tEAm.

Erphaan is very active on social media with Twitter, Facebook and Instagram profiles. He believes that social media opens up avenue for artists and its important for him as an artist to take the time out to understand the marketing strategies behind social media.

#noSeasons 
The #noSeasons project was founded by Erphaan in 2016. It is geared towards promoting, inspiring and encouraging more soca release in Trinidad and Tobago after carnival. The objective, according to EA, is remove the ‘Soca is carnival music’ stigma, while fostering a new culture where, soca thrive all year round.

Since 2016 EA has been releasing new music as a part of the #noSeason project. In 2016 he released "Never Find", “Believe”, and “Island Crashers Medley”. In 2017 he released “Morning Come”, “Grip Me”, and “Knock knee” ft Salty. 2018 he released “No Habla”.
In May 2019 at the Vas Lounge, Woodbrook, Trinidad, EA premiered the music video for his latest single under the #noSeasons project, ‘Lock On’. "Rather than playing the same soca tunes year round, we should see new soca singles dropping every month, that is why I chose the theme of 'No Seasons' to describe the event. No other genre has any season, and neither should soca music." EA addressed fans and supporters at the premiere.

Background

Musical style 
Erphaan reflects a diverse musical style, bringing a fresh pop-type sound to soca. He is known to incorporate clever story-lines and memorable moments into his music.

Discography

Music Videos

Singles

Filmography

References 

Soca musicians
21st-century Trinidad and Tobago male singers
21st-century Trinidad and Tobago singers
1991 births
Living people